David L. Shadding (born February 8, 1941) is a former Democratic member of the Pennsylvania House of Representatives.

References

Democratic Party members of the Pennsylvania House of Representatives
1941 births
Living people